Barvinok Volodymyr Ivanovych (July 22, 1879 in Ohramyyevychi, Chernihiv oblast, Russian Empire – 1943 in Kiev, Soviet Union) was a Ukrainian historian, theologist, bibliographer, writer, archaeologist, prominent archivist, statesman of the Ukrainian National Republic, honorary citizen of the Chernihiv region, scholar at the Ukrainian Academy of Science, and teacher of Ukrainian culture and history.

Biography 
Volodymyr Barvinok was born in 1879 at the family country house, which was located in the Ogramyyevychi village in the Chernihiv region. In 1905, Barvinok graduated from the Kyiv Mohyla Academy, which today is called the National University of Kyiv-Mohyla Academy. On the same year, he married Yevheniya Volovik, who was originally from Uman. The Barvinok family lived in the Podil district of Kiev, at 31 Frunze street.

From 1905 to 1917, Volodymyr Barvinok and his family lived in St.Petersburg, where his son Boris was born. From 1905 to 1908, Barvinok studied in Saint Petersburg Archeological Institute.  From 1908 to 1911, he majored in history and philology at the St. Petersburg University, then called Petrograd University.  Consequently, he earned a master's degree in theology. The family frequently took trips to Kiev in their free time.

Up until the year 1917, he worked in the central apparatus of the Most Holy Synod. At the same time, during 1912–1917, he lectured in history at the St. Petersburg's Realschule of A.I. Gelda. Upon receiving the first news of the revolution, Volodymyr Barvinok immediately returned to Kiev, where he was deeply involved in the renewal of Ukrainian independence.

By 1918, Volodymyr Barvinok, as a prominent bibliographer and a scholar of ancient manuscripts and books, assisted in the formation of the National Library of Ukrainian State. From 1918 to 1919, he worked for the Ukrainian State, later for the Ukrainian National Republic at the department of confessions, then for the Ministry of Confessions.

The aim of this department as a whole, as well as Volodymyr Barvinok's particular responsibility, was regulating and conducting the state policy towards the Church. The Ministry demanded from the Church an implementation of a Ukrainization policy of the official documents and pushed for the independence (autocephaly) of the Ukrainian Orthodox Church from the Moscow Patriarchate. The Ministry's work created a friendly partnership between the independent state of Ukraine and the Church. Simultaneously to his work at the Ukrainian National Republic's government institutions, Barvinok worked as a professor of literature and Ukrainian culture at a technical school in Kiev.

As the Ukrainian People's Army retreated from Kiev and independent Ukraine fell, Barvinok remained in occupied Kiev and focused on scientific work. During the period of 1918–1928, he worked at the historical-philological branch of the Ukrainian Academy of Science. Despite political repression and a difficult financial situation, the historical-philological department worked persistently to expand the use of the Ukrainian language in all branches of science. On September 30, 1924, Barvinok became the secretary of a commission created on the 350th anniversary of the printing traditions in Ukraine, under the larger Archaeological Committee of the Ukrainian Academy of Science headed by the first president of Ukraine and renowned historian Mykhailo Hrushevskyi. The aim of Barvinok's commission was to write a scientific description of the publications on the territory of ethnographic Ukraine in 16th–18th centuries. 
 
From 1924 until 1933, Barvinok worked on the archaeological committee at the Ukrainian Academy of Science. At the same time, he worked for the Ukrainian Scientific Institute of Printing, where he published the prominent and comprehensive work "General survey of old prints in libraries of Kiev". In the introduction, he criticizes the lack of financing for the Ukrainian Academy of Science and underlines principal differences between old prints of Kiev and Moscow, both dangerous acts at the time. From 1928 to 1930, he worked as a secretary of the Sophia commission of the Academy of Science and its art branch. In 1930, his grandson Yury was born.

The Sophia commission aimed at preserving Saint Sophia Cathedral in Kiev, which Soviet authorities planned to demolish as they had destroyed St. Michael's Golden-Domed Monastery. Soviet authorities aimed at eradicating any signs of authentic Ukrainian cultural heritage. Due to the tedious work of the commission, Saint Sophia cathedral, arguably the most historically important Ukrainian structure, was spared from a tragic end.

In the mid-1930s, Barvinok donated his vast library to the Kiev University, where it formed the basis of several scientific branches. In the period from 1930 to 1933, Barvinok worked as the secretary of the All Ukrainian Archaeological Committee, which coordinated all archaeological work in Ukraine. In 1937, his son Boris, a bridge engineer, was arrested by the NKVD, Soviet secret police; Barvinok never saw him again. This was not the first instance of repression against Volodymyr Barvinok's family.  Those close to him lived in constant fear, facing arrests and torture. Barvinok, being a participant of the highest echelons of both the Russian Empire and the independent Ukraine, was a tempting target for the Soviets, but his prominence in numerous scientific circles made it difficult to arrest him personally. Towards the end of his life, Barvinok wrote on Slavic and Ukrainian themes; many of his works were never published. He died in 1943 during the German occupation of Kiev.

Notes

External links 
 Chernihiv Regional Information Portal: Sivershchyna
 National Library of V.I. Vernadskyy
 Explanatory dictionaries
 Electronic library of journalism institute
 UKRAINIAN HISTORIANS of XX CENTURY

1879 births
1943 deaths
20th-century Ukrainian historians
National University of Kyiv-Mohyla Academy alumni
Ukrainian politicians before 1991
Ukrainian archaeologists
Ukrainian educators
20th-century Ukrainian educators
20th-century Ukrainian writers